ANEK Lines (Ανώνυμη Ναυτιλιακή Εταιρεία Κρήτης, Anonymi Naftiliaki Eteria Kritis, Anonymous Shipping Company of Crete) is one of the largest passenger shipping companies in Greece. It was founded in 1967 by numerous shareholders who were inhabitants of Crete. It operates passenger ferries, mainly on Piraeus-Crete and Adriatic Sea lines.

Today the company is listed on the Athens Stock Exchange and 37.5% owned by Cyprus-based Sea Star Capital PLC (Yannis S. Vardinoyannis).

Also Amalia Vardinoyannis holds a 26.9% stake through her holding company Varmin.

History

In Crete protests broke out after the Typaldos Lines car ferry  capsized due to a series of safety regulations violations. The ship sank on her way from Chania to Piraeus on 8 December 1966, resulting in the death of more than 200 people.

In the aftermath a few hundreds of Cretans (traders, free-lancers, pensioners, farmers) following a proposal by the Association of Economists of the Chania Prefecture and the support of the Metropolitan of Kissamos and Selinos, Irineos Galanakis, implement their idea to found a multi-shareholder shipping company.

Therefore, on
1967 - April 10, ANEK Lines was founded with its head offices located at Chania. At the beginning only born Cretans could hold stocks in ANEK Lines.
1970 The company's first F/B vessel Kydon started servicing the route Piraeus-Chania
1973 The F/B's Candia and Rethymo started servicing the route Piraeus-Iraklion
1978 The F/B Kriti started daily servicing the route Piraeus-Chania
1987 The F/B Apterastarted servicing the route Piraeus-Chania
New route Crete-Thessaloniki started (route closed then suddenly)
1989 The F/B's Lato and Lissos started servicing the route Patras-Corfu/Igoumenitsa-Ancona
New blue-yellow corporate identity introduced
The F/B Kydon was sold.
1992 ANEK Lines new flagship the F/B El. Venizelos started servicing the route Greece-Italy.
F/B Talos started servicing the route Patras-Trieste
1994 New route opened, Patras-Igoumenitsa-Bari, but already ceased the following year
1997 The F/B's Kriti I & Kriti II started new nonstop Patras-Ancona service
1998 Share-capital increase and initial public offering (IPO) for the company's stocks in the Athens Stock Exchange
F/B "Sokofles V" starts operating the route to Northern Italy (Patras-Trieste)
Take over some stakes in DANE
1999 The company's stocks started trading on the Athens Stock Exchange on 21 January 1999
ANEK Lines purchases 50% of the share-capital of LANE (Ag. Nikolaos), with the assignment of the F/B Talos.
ANEK Lines merge with RETHYMNIAKI and integrate their ships F/B Prevelis and F/B Arkadi into the fleet
ANEK Lines ITALIA s.r.l.was founded. ANEK Lines holds 51% of its shares
ANEK Lines buys 16.5% of NEL Lines
ANEN was founded. ANEK Lines holds 20% of its shares

2000 The F/B Lefka Ori was purchased, fully renovated and started servicing the route Patras-Ancona.
ANEK Lines increase its shares to 41,9% of the share-capital of DANE
ANEK Lines buys 50% of the share-capital of ETANAP
ANEK Lines buys 62% of the share-capital of LEFKA ORI A.B.E.E.
Contract signed with the Norwegian shipyard Fosen Mek Shipyard for the shipbuilding of two new buildings (first time for ANEK) with delivery dates October 2000 and May 2001 with an option for two more.
Delivery of the newly constructed Olympic Champion servicing the route Patra - Ancona which completes the route Igoumenitsa - Ancona in 15 hours.
ANEK Lines increases its share-capital (25% = 9.5 billion drachmas / 27.88 million EUROs)
The F/B's Candia and Rethymno are sold
ANEK Lines increases its share-capital in NEL to 19.05%
2001 Established online connections to the international booking systems START, MERLIN, AMADEUS and SIGMA
Delivery of the second newly constructed H/S/F Hellenic Spirit servicing along with the H/S/F Olympic Champion the route Patra - Igoumenitsa - Ancona reducing the travelling time from Igoumenitsa - Ancona to 15 hours.
The former Patras-Ancona operating ships, Kriti I and Kriti II, were deployed then on Patras-Triest and Ravena-Catania (Kriti I)
2002 The F/B's Kriti I & Kriti II deployed on the Piraeus-Heraklion service
2003 ANEK Lines set up a ro/ro operations called ANEK CARGO for the routes Piraeus–Heraklion, Patras–Bari and Patras–Venice
2005 in May ANEK sold its 16.5% shares in NEL Lines to Edgewater Holdings with a €0.5 million profit
in November the F/B Aptera was sold with a €2.5m. net profit
the new Patras-Venice route is added to the route to Northern Italy
the construction of the company's building is completed as well as the relocation of administrative services to the company-owned, functional establishment in Chania(Karamanli avenue former Souda Avenue)
2007 in February the company's latest establishment in Piraeus is inaugurated, housing the Directorate of Commercial
Exploitation, the Directorate of Technical Services and the Piraeus main agency
2008 in April the P/S-F/S Prevelis entered service on the Piraeus-Paros-Naxos-Ios-Santorini line
 in July 2008 the P/S-F/S Lissos entered service between Piraeus and Chios-Mytilini
 in September 2008 the P/S-F/S Elyros entered service between Piraeus and Chania
 in December 2008 ANEK was awarded a prize as "The Best Passenger Line of the Year 2008" during the 5th Greek Shipping Awards ceremony hosted by Lloyd's List
2010 April, ANEK established a new subsidiary AIGAION PELAGOS THALASSIES GRAMMES SHIPPING COMPANY (Chania), to charter and operate the east Aegean and specifically the Piraeus-Syros-Mykonos-Ikaria-Fourni–Samos route and in September this new company undertook the Heraklion route which it is servicing by chartering Parent Company's vessels 
2011 1 June, ANEK Lines started a 3-year joint service agreement with Attica Group (Superfast, Blue Star Ferries) for the route Patras–Igoumenitsa–Ancona and Piraeus–Irakleion under the name ANEK-Superfast. Therefore, ANEK deploy its ferry Olympic Champion from the Ancona service (now a joint venture operations with ANEK's Lefka Ori and the Superfast VI and XI) to the Irakleio service (now a joint venture operations with Superfast XII). 
2012 14 June, F/B Lato deployed in the international line Bari - Durrës in cooperation with Adriatica Lines for the summer season.
2014 F/B Ierapetra L. deployed in the international line Bari - Durrës in Charter from ANEK Italia for year-round service. A major engine-room fire on 29 November 2014 when underway with crew only aboard caused substantial damage to the ship which returned to Brindisi Italy. No injuries or fatalities occurred. The vessel is currently out of operation.
2014 Due to the 2014 Libyan conflict, Libya's House of Representatives has been housed on the ANEK's ferry Elyros which has been moored off the coast of Tobruk in eastern Libya.
2015 ANEK operates the Sophocles V as Kydon on the Piraeus-Chania. The Olympic Champion returns to the Adriatic, and the El. Venizelos operates in the Northern Aegean in order to transport Syrian refugees arriving in Chios and Lesvos.

Fleet
Fleet of ANEK Lines are motor Ro-Ro/passenger ferries.

Currently operating

Former Fleet
Kydon 1968-1989 (scrapped)
Candia 1973-2000 (scrapped in 2011 as Jabal Ali 1)
Rethymnon 1973-2000 (scrapped in 2009 as Jabal Ali 2)
Zakros 1977-1985 (scrapped)
Kriti 1978-1996 (scrapped in 2004 as Express)
Aptera 1985-2005 (scrapped in 2011 as Morning Sun)
Lato 1987-2015 (scrapped in 2018 as Talaton)
Lissos 1987-2011 (scrapped in 2011 at Alang India)
Talos 1995-1999 as Ierapetra L 2008-2015 (as Aqua Blue for Seajets since 2016)
Arkadi 1999-2002 (sank as Pella for Arab Bridge Maritime Company at Red Sea in 2011)
Sophocles Venizelos 1999-2013 as Kydon for Anek Lines again
Lefka Ori 1999-2013 (as Blue Galaxy for Blue Star Ferries since 2015)
Coraggio 2012-2013 (as Athena Seaways for DFDS Seaways since 2013)
Forza 2012-2016 (as Forza for Acciona Transmediterranea since 2016)
Audacia 2013-2014 (as Rizhao Orient for a Chinese company since 2014)
Norman Atlantic 2014-2014 (caught fire on 28 December 2014 near Corfu. Laid-Up for 4 years in Bari scrapped in Aliaga in 2019)
Asterion 2016-2018 (as Connemara for Brittany Ferries since 2018)
Asterion II 2018-2022 now operating on charter for Superfast Ferries as Asterion II

ANEK-Superfast
On 7 June 2011 ANEK Lines and Superfast Ferries created a joint venture for the Piraeus-Heraklion and the Patra-Igoumenitsa-Ancona routes with two RO-PAX ships on the first route (the ANEK-owned Olympic Champion and the Superfast-owned Superfast XII) and three in the second route (the ANEK-owned Hellenic Spirit and the Superfast-owned Superfast VI and Superfast XI).

Routes
Greece domestic
Piraeus–Chania
Piraeus–Heraklio (Kriti I)
Piraeus–Milos–Santorini–Anafi–Heraklio–Sitia–Kasos–Karpathos–Rhodes (Prevelis)
Greece- Italy
Patras – Igoumenitsa – Ancona  (Hellenic Spirit – Elyros)

Affiliates
Companies that are affiliates of ANEK Lines (larger than 10%) are outlined below.
ANEK Group:
ANEK HOLDINGS S.A. (Greece, Crete - Chania): 99.5% Tourism- participation in other companies- consulting, etc.  
ΑΝΕΚ LINES ITALIA srl (Italy, Ancona): 49%, Factoring and representation of shipping companies
LANE S.A. (Lane Lines, Greece, Crete - Ag. Nikolaos):50,11%, Passenger ferry shipping    
AIGAION PELAGOS - THALASSIES GRAMMES SHIPPING COMPANY (Crete, Chania): 99.90%, Sailing company under Law 959/79
T.C. SAILING (Greece, Crete - Chania): 97,5% Sailing company under Law 959/79  
ETANAP S.A. (Greece, Crete - Chania/Stylos): 50%, Production and distribution of bottled water    
LEFKA ORI S.A. (Greece, Crete - Chania/Stylos): 62%, Production and trade of plastic bottles and packaging products
CHAMPION FERRIES L.T.D. (Marshal Island): 70%, Shipping
Cooperative Bank of Chania: 0.01%

Former affiliates and investments:
NEL Lines 16.5% (shares sold 2005 to Edgewater Holdings)
DANE Sea Lines 41.87% (stop operations in August 2004 after financial difficulties)
RETHYMNIAKI (took over and finally merged into ANEK Lines in 1999)
ANEN 19.36%

Accidents and incidents 

 On August 28, 2018, at 23:45 (UTC+03:00), it was reported that El. Venizelos, one of ANEK's fleet, has caught on fire right after leaving from Piraeus' port for Chania, boarding 875 passengers and 140 crew members. The ferry managed to get back to Piraeus with no injuries.

References

External links

ANEK Lines (www.anek.gr)  
ANEK Lines (ΑΝΕΚ) - Athens | (capital.gr profile)
ANEK Lines ships' videos

Transport companies established in 1967
Companies listed on the Athens Exchange
Ferry companies of Greece
Shipping companies of Greece
Greek companies established in 1967